Tylomelania celebicola is a species of freshwater snail with an operculum, an aquatic gastropod mollusk in the family Pachychilidae.

This species was originally described as a subspecies. The specific name celebicola is derived from the Celebes, a former name of Sulawesi, where this species occurs.

Distribution 
This species occurs in central Sulawesi, Indonesia.

Ecology 
Tylomelania celebicola is a riverine species.

References

celebicola
Gastropods described in 1898